Brian Daniel Medina (born 17 April 1993) is an Argentine professional footballer who plays as a centre-back for Almirante Brown.

Career
Medina came through the youth system of San Lorenzo. Bragado signed Medina on loan in 2014. One goal in thirty-three matches followed in Torneo Federal B across the 2014 and 2015 seasons. In 2016, Medina completed a move to Primera B Metropolitana's Colegiales. He made his debut on 6 February 2016 against Villa San Carlos, which was the first of sixteen appearances in 2016. A further forty-one matches followed in two campaigns. Medina surpassed 100 league appearances for Colegiales in 2019–20, though would depart the club midway through in order to sign with Ituzaingó in Primera C Metropolitana.

After a spell at Deportivo Armenio in 2021, Medina moved to Primera Nacional club Club Almirante Brown in January 2022.

Career statistics
.

References

External links

1993 births
Living people
People from Temperley
Argentine footballers
Association football defenders
Primera B Metropolitana players
San Lorenzo de Almagro footballers
Club Atlético Colegiales (Argentina) players
Club Atlético Ituzaingó players
Deportivo Armenio footballers
Club Almirante Brown footballers
Sportspeople from Buenos Aires Province